Several highways are numbered 100:

Australia
 Great Ocean Road, Victoria
 Surf Coast Highway, Victoria
 Flinders Highway, South Australia
 Lincoln Highway, South Australia

Canada
 Alberta Highway 100 (Sherwood Park Freeway) (unsigned)
  Manitoba Highway 100 (Perimeter Highway)
  New Brunswick Route 100
  Newfoundland and Labrador Route 100 
  Niagara Regional Road 100, Ontario 
  former Highway 100 (Ontario)

Costa Rica
 National Route 100

Croatia 

  D100 road

Germany
 Bundesautobahn 100, the Berliner Stadtring (Berlin City Ring Road)
 Bundesstraße 100

India 

 National Highway 100 (former, now National Highway 522 (India))

Korea, South
 Seoul Ring Expressway

Malaysia
 A100 road (Malaysia), a road in Perak
 Federal Route 100 (Lumut Bypass), a highway bypass in Manjung district, Perak

Mexico 

  Sonora State Highway 100

Netherlands
 Stadsroute 100 (Amsterdam), the city center ring road

Philippines
 N100 highway (Philippines)

Poland 

  Voivodeship road 100 (Poland) in the Pomeranian Voivodeship

Serbia 

  State Road 100 (Serbia), an IIA-class road connecting Horgoš with Batajnica.

Turkey
State road D.100 (Turkey), a west–east state road running from the Bulgarian border to Iranian border.

United Kingdom
 , part of the London Inner Ring Road

United States
  Alabama State Route 100
  Arkansas Highway 100
  California State Route 100
   Colorado State Highway 100
   Connecticut Route 100
  Delaware Route 100
  Florida State Road 100
  Georgia State Route 100
  Illinois Route 100
  Indiana State Road 100 (former)
   Iowa Highway 100
  K-100 (Kansas highway) (former)
  Kentucky Route 100
   Louisiana Highway 100
  Maine State Route 100
  Maryland Route 100
  Maryland Route 100 (1930s-1950s)
  Maryland Route 100 (former)
 Maryland Route 100J
 Maryland Route 100L
 Maryland Route 100M
 Maryland Route 100N
 Maryland Route 100O
 Maryland Route 100P
 Maryland Route 100Q
 Maryland Route 100R
 Maryland Route 100S
 Maryland Route 100T
 Maryland Route 100U
 Maryland Route 100V
 Maryland Route 100W
 Maryland Route 100X
  M-100 (Michigan highway)
  Minnesota State Highway 100
  Missouri Route 100
  Nebraska Highway 100 (former)
  New Jersey Route 100 (former)
  County Route 100 (Bergen County, New Jersey)
  New York State Route 100
  County Route 100 (Cortland County, New York)
  County Route 100 (Dutchess County, New York)
  County Route 100 (Rockland County, New York)
  County Route 100 (Suffolk County, New York)
  County Route 100 (Wayne County, New York)
   North Carolina Highway 100
  Ohio State Route 100
  Oklahoma State Highway 100
  Pennsylvania Route 100
  Rhode Island Route 100
  South Dakota Highway 100 (proposed)
  Tennessee State Route 100
  Texas State Highway 100
  Texas State Highway Spur 100
  Farm to Market Road 100
  Texas Park Road 100
   Utah State Route 100
  Vermont Route 100
  Virginia State Route 100
  Washington State Route 100
  West Virginia Route 100
   Wisconsin Highway 100

Territories
  Puerto Rico Highway 100

See also
 List of highways numbered 100A
 List of highways numbered 100B
 List of highways numbered 100C
 A100